The Chromium Embedded Framework (CEF) is an open-source software framework for embedding a Chromium web browser within another application. This enables developers to add web browsing functionality to their application, as well as the ability to use HTML, CSS, and JavaScript to create the application's user interface (or just portions of it).

CEF runs on Linux, macOS, and Windows. It has many language bindings including C, C++, Go, Java, and Python.

Overview
There are two versions of Chromium Embedded Framework: CEF 1 and CEF 3. Development of CEF 2 was abandoned after the appearance of the Chromium Content API.

CEF 1 is a single-process implementation based on the Chromium WebKit API. It is no longer actively developed or supported.

CEF 3 is a multi-process implementation based on the Chromium Content API and has performance similar to Google Chrome. It uses asynchronous messaging to communicate between the main application process and one or more render processes (Blink + V8 JavaScript engine). It supports PPAPI plugins and extensions, both internal (PDF viewer) or externally loadable. 
The single-process run mode is not supported, but still present; currently is being used for debugging purposes only.

On March 16, 2019, the CEF version numbering changed with the release of CEF 73.1.3+g46cf800+chromium-73.0.3683.75. The previous release on March 14, 2019 was CEF 3.3683.1920.g9f41a27. Both of these releases were based on Chromium 73.0.3683.75, however the new version numbering has the major number the same as the Chromium major version number it is based on.

CEF comes with a sample application called CefClient that is written in C++ using WinAPI, Cocoa, or GTK (depending on the platform) and contains demos of various features. Newer versions include a sample application called CefSimple that, along with an accompanying tutorial, show how to create a simple application using CEF 3.

Documentation can be found in the header files located in the "include" directory and on wiki pages.

Supported languages
The base CEF framework includes support for the C and C++ programming languages, but there are external projects that provide bindings for other languages:

 Delphi (CEF1) – DCEF 1
 Delphi (CEF3) – DCEF 3
 Delphi (CEF3) – CEF4Delphi
 Delphi (CEF3) – WebKitX CEF3 ActiveX
 Dyalog APL (CEF3) – HTMLRenderer
Free Pascal (CEF3) - fpCEF3
 Go (CEF3) – CEF2go
 Java (CEF3) – Java Chromium Embedded
 .NET (CEF1, CEF3) – CefSharp
 .NET (CEF1) – CefGlue
 .NET/Mono (CEF3) – Xilium.CefGlue
 .NET (CEF3) – ChromiumFX
 .NET (CEF3) – WebKitX CEF3 ActiveX
 Python (CEF1, CEF3) – CEF Python
 Swift (CEF3) – CEF.swift
 Visual Basic 6 (CEF3) – WebKitX CEF3 ActiveX
 Visual FoxPro (CEF3) – WebKitX CEF3 ActiveX
 PowerBuilder (CEF3) – WebKitX CEF3 ActiveX
 Ruby (via the 'win32ole' library) (CEF3) – WebKitX CEF3 ActiveX
 Visual Basic for Applications 2003/2007/2010/2015/2016 (VBA, Access, Excel) (CEF3) – WebKitX CEF3 ActiveX
 Microsoft Visual Studio .NET 2010/2015/2017 (VB.Net, C#, C++, 32-bit and 64-bit) (CEF3) – WebKitX CEF3 ActiveX
 Xojo (for Windows apps, 32-bit and 64-bit) (CEF3) – WebKitX CEF3 ActiveX
 Qt (any Windows version, only for 32-bit) (CEF3) – WebKitX CEF3 ActiveX
 CodeTyphon Studio -package pl_CEF
 Embarcadero RAD Studio (VCL C++) (CEF3) - WebKitX CEF3 ActiveX
 Broadcom CA PLEX (VBScript / C++) (CEF3) - WebKitX CEF3 ActiveX
 YallFramework (YS /WS ) (FF213 - WevKitX CEF57 ActiveX)

Applications using CEF 

 4D – relational database management system and IDE
 Adobe
 Adobe Acrobat
 Adobe Illustrator – vector graphics editor
 Adobe Creative Cloud
 Adobe Dreamweaver – web development tool which uses CEF to control resource loading, navigation and context menus Adobe Chromium Embedded
 Adobe Edge Animate – multimedia authoring tools
 Adobe Edge Reflow – web design tool
 Adobe Brackets – previously closed-source IDE
 AIM – instant messaging client that uses CEF on Windows
 alt:V - multiplayer engine for PC game Grand Theft Auto V
 Amazon Music Player – official media player for Amazon Music
 AOL Desktop – web browser with integrated AOL email and IM clients
 Autodesk Inventor – 3D design tool. Since version 2015, it uses CEF for the 'My Home' feature, a home-page that allows users to create new CAD files and view tutorials.
 Battle.net App – official client for Battle.net
 BeamNG.drive – uses CEF to render UI
 Bitdefender Safepay Browser – part of Bitdefender Internet Security software
 Brackets – open source code editor for the web
 Desura client – official client for Desura
 Dish World IPTV – streaming video platform
 Dyalog APL – Uses CEF for its user commands ]HTML, ]Plot, and ]APLCart
 Epic Games Launcher – official client for Epic Games Store
 Eve Online launcher – official launcher for Eve Online
 ExpanDrive – network file system client 
 Facebook Messenger for Windows
 Foxmail – freeware email client by Tencent
 GOG Galaxy – official client for GOG.com
 Google Web Designer – create interactive HTML5 sites and ads
 Grand Theft Auto Online – multiplayer engine for PC game Grand Theft Auto V
 Intel AppUp Encapsulator – Intel app store software
 KKBox – streaming music platform
 League of Legends launcher – official launcher for League of Legends
 LiveCode – multi-platform app development software
 Mailbird – Windows email software
 MATLAB – Uses CEF for its uifigures
 MediaMan – organizer software
 Microsoft Power BI – Business Intelligence software
 Minecraft Launcher – official launcher for Minecraft 
 Multi Theft Auto – multiplayer engine for PC game Grand Theft Auto: San Andreas
 OBS Studio browser plugin - Live streaming software
 PHP Desktop – provide a way for developing native desktop GUI applications using web technologies such as PHP, HTML5, JavaScript and SQLite. 
 PokerStars – online poker cardroom
 QuarkXPress – JavaScript support
 RAGE Multiplayer - multiplayer engine for PC game Grand Theft Auto V
 Rockstar Games Launcher – official client for Social Club
 Second Life – online virtual world
 Sling TV – IPTV service operated by Dish Network.
 Spotify Desktop Client – streaming music platform
 StarUML – UML model editor
 Steam client – official client for Steam
 Tencent QQ – instant messaging program (its QPlus part) and web browser
 TouchDesigner - creative development platform 
 TOWeb – responsive website creation software
 Trend Micro Internet Security – antivirus software
 Ubisoft Connect client – official client for Ubisoft Connect
 UBot Studio – internet marketing and web automation software
 Uniface – Uniface runtime and development environment
 Unity – game engine
 Unreal Engine – game engine
 Xojo – uses CEF with its HTMLViewer control on Windows

See also

 Electron
 Qt WebEngine
 XULRunner
 DotNetBrowser

References

External links
 

C++ software
Free software
Google Chrome